Ernesto Lupercio is a Mexican mathematician. He was awarded the ICTP Ramanujan Prize in 2009, "for his outstanding contributions to algebraic topology, geometry and mathematical physics."

Lupercio earned a Ph.D. from Stanford University in 1997 under the guidance of Ralph L. Cohen. He was a member of the Global Young Academy (2011-2016) and a member of the Third World Academy of Sciences.

Selected publications

References

Mexican mathematicians
Date of birth missing (living people)
Living people
Stanford University alumni
Mathematical physicists
Place of birth missing (living people)
Year of birth missing (living people)